Pseudophimosia is a genus of beetles in the family Cerambycidae, containing the following species:

 Pseudophimosia eburioides (White, 1853)
 Pseudophimosia sexlineata (Buquet, 1859)

References

Trachyderini
Cerambycidae genera